The following is an alphabetical list of subregions in the United Nations geoscheme for Europe, created by the United Nations Statistics Division (UNSD). The scheme subdivides the continent into Eastern Europe, Northern Europe, Southern Europe, and Western Europe. The UNSD notes that "the assignment of countries or areas to specific groupings is for statistical convenience and does not imply any assumption regarding political or other affiliation of countries or territories".

Eastern Europe 

 
 
 
 
 
 
 
 †
 
 

† Although Russia is a transcontinental country covering Northern Asia as well, for statistical convenience, Russia is assigned under Eastern Europe by UNSD, including both European Russia and Siberian Russia under a single subregion.

Northern Europe

Channel Islands

Southern Europe

Western Europe

See also 

 List of continents and continental subregions by population
 List of countries by United Nations geoscheme
 Regions of Europe
 United Nations geoscheme
 United Nations geoscheme for Africa
 United Nations geoscheme for the Americas
 United Nations geoscheme for Asia
 United Nations geoscheme for Oceania
 United Nations Regional Groups
 United Nations Statistics Division

References 

Geography of Europe
Europe